Debit and Credit (1855) is a novel in six volumes by Gustav Freytag. It was one of the most popular and widely read German novels of the 19th century.

It was translated into English as Debit and Credit by Georgiana Malcolm née Harcourt in 1857.

The novel concerns a Polish uprising against German colonization in Prussian Poland, where German settlers are seen as displacing the ethnically Slavic Polish inhabitants. Freytag unequivocally endorses this displacement, espousing ardent Anti-Polish sentiment and German racial superiority, stating that "there is an old warfare between [Germans] and the Slavonic tribes; and [Germans] feel with pride that culture, industry, and credit are [their] side. Whatever the Polish proprietors around [them] may now be—and there are many rich and intelligent men among them—every dollar that [these proprietors] can spend, they have made, directly or indirectly, by German intelligence. Their wild flocks are improved by [German] breeds; [who] erect the machinery that fills their spirit-casks."

The novel, a Zeitroman or "social novel", deals with interactions among broad segments of German society during the 19th century. The classes represented are the mercantile or bourgeois class, the nobility, and the Jews:

 The bourgeois Schröter family represents Freytag's view of the ideal bourgeois type, invested in order, honesty, and solid virtue.
 The noble Rothsattel family represents the old nobility, who try to preserve their privileges in a changing society. Their struggle to avoid their impending financial ruin portrays this dynamic.
 The Jewish Ehrenthal family are money-lenders and speculators. Veitel Itzig is a criminal employee of the family.

In 1977, the novel came close to being filmed by Rainer Werner Fassbinder, but after a debate about its alleged anti-semitic content this project was abandoned.

Plot
After the death of his father, young Anton Wohlfart begins an apprenticeship in the office of the merchant T. O. Schröter in Breslau. Anton quickly succeeds through honest and diligent work, achieving a proper bourgeois existence. He has a variety of experiences with the Schröter family and also with the noble family of the Rothsattels. He later becomes involved with the liquidation of the estate of the Rothsattel family, an obvious symbol of the decline of the nobility and of its clash with emergent capitalist forces.

Anton has repeated interactions with two other young men, the Jew Veitel Itzig, whom he had known already in his home town, Ostrava, and a young nobleman, Herr von Fink, who is a co-worker in the Schröter firm.

Interpretation
Anton Wohlfart is the emerging hero. As a result of his manifold experiences, he develops a sober and virtuous outlook (Weltanschauung).

See also
 Bildungsroman
 Zeitroman

References

External links
 
 Debit and Credit Archive.org

German bildungsromans
1855 German novels
Novels set in Germany
Antisemitic novels